John Peoples Jr. is an American physicist who served as Fermilab's third director, served as director of the Sloan Digital Sky Survey, and oversaw the shutdown of the Superconducting Super Collider.

John Peoples Jr. was born on January 22, 1933, in New York City. After graduating from Staten Island Academy in 1950, he received a BSEE from the Carnegie Institute of Technology in 1955. He worked as an engineer at Martin-Marietta Corporation until 1959, when he entered Columbia University. He received his PhD in physics in 1966 and remained at Columbia as Assistant Professor of Physics until 1969, when he began teaching at Cornell University.

Peoples joined Fermilab as a physicist in 1971, eventually becoming head of the Proton Area. In 1981, Peoples became project manager of Tevatron I, which transformed the Tevatron from a fixed target accelerator to a proton-antiproton collider, and oversaw the construction of the Antiproton Source. Peoples left Fermilab briefly from 1987 to 1988 to assist the Central Design Group for the Superconducting Super Collider at Lawrence Berkeley Laboratory. When he returned to Fermilab in the fall of 1988, he became deputy director of the lab. After Leon M. Lederman stepped down from the Fermilab directorship, Peoples became director on July 1, 1989.

During Peoples's time as Fermilab's director, the lab increased the Tevatron's luminosity by a factor of 20 between 1990 and 1994, which made it possible for Fermilab's experiments CDF and D0 to discover the top quark. He also oversaw the construction of Fermilab's Main Injector from proposal in 1990 to completion in 1999.  In addition to his work at Fermilab, Peoples managed the shutdown of Superconducting Super Collider between 1993 and 1994, served as chairman of the International Committee for Future Accelerators from 1993 to 1997, and was director of the Sloan Digital Sky Survey from June 1998 to June 2003. He stepped down from his position as Fermilab director in June 1999.

References

External links
 John Peoples's scientific publications on INSPIRE-HEP

1933 births
21st-century American physicists
People associated with Fermilab
Columbia Graduate School of Arts and Sciences alumni
Cornell University faculty
Carnegie Mellon University alumni
Living people